Rhopalomyia strobiligemma is a species of gall midge, insects in the family Cecidomyiidae.

References

Cecidomyiinae
Insects described in 1910
Taxa named by Fannie A. Stebbins